Amydrium zippelianum is a flowering plant in genus Amydrium of the arum family, Araceae. Its pattern is very distinctive and is sometimes cultivated as an ornamental plant.

Distribution 
Its native range is Central Malesia to New Guinea.It is often common, but rarely seen now in Philippines, Sulawesi, Halmahera, Talaud Islands, Irian Jaya, and Papua New Guinea.

Habitat 
Primary lowland to lower montane rainforest, occasionally in regrowth or as a weed in plantations.

Medical Uses 
Its leaves can be used as traditional medicine for sore ribs. 

How to take care of amydrium zippelianum?
Watering: Water when top 2-3" of soil are dry
Bright and/or direct sunlight will scorch leaves
A well-draining, nutrient rich mix is ideal.

References 

Monsteroideae